Tyrone Wheatley Jr. (born February 4, 1997), also known as T.J. Wheatley, is an American football offensive tackle for the Cleveland Browns of the National Football League (NFL). Wheatley played college football at the University of Michigan, Stony Brook University, and Morgan State University.

Early life and high school
Wheatley played tight end and defensive end at Canisius High School, where he was also named The Buffalo News' player of the year. He was listed as a four-star prospect by Rivals.com, who ranked him as the 13th best tight end prospect in the nation and the top ranked in New York state. ESPN also named him the No. 12 overall prospect in the nation. As a defensive end, Wheatley was ranked as the 25th-best prospect in the country and the top overall prospect in New York state by Scout.com.

Wheatley also held offers from Alabama, Florida, UCLA and USC, but committed to Michigan, his father's alma mater, on February 4, 2015.

College career

Michigan 
Wheatley, playing as a tight end, missed his entire true freshman season with a foot injury. He scored his first touchdown against Illinois on October 22, 2016. He finished the season with three receptions for 35 yards, playing in 12 games. In his sophomore season, Wheatley made his first collegiate start against Florida on September 2, 2017. He made three starts in the season, catching three receptions for 26 yards.

Wheatley fractured his metatarsal in his foot in March 2018, ruling him out for spring ball. On August 2, 2018, a day before Michigan started training camp, Wheatley announced that he would be departing the team.

Stony Brook 
On August 5, 2018, Stony Brook announced that Wheatley had transferred to the Seawolves. Moving from FBS to FCS, he was eligible immediately. Wheatley made his first start at tight end for Stony Brook on September 22 against Richmond. Wheatley started in eight games for Stony Brook, recording six receptions for 36 yards on the season.

Morgan State 
Wheatley played the 2019 season for the Bears where his father, Tyrone Wheatley, was in his first year as the head coach.

Professional career

The Spring League
Wheatley played for the Blues in 2021 The Spring League season, converting from tight end to offensive tackle.

Chicago Bears
He signed with the Chicago Bears on June 17, 2021. Wheatley was waived during final roster cuts, but re-signed to the team's practice squad. He signed a reserve/future contract with the Bears on January 11, 2022. He was waived on May 6, 2022.

Las Vegas Raiders
On May 15, 2022, Wheatley signed with the Las Vegas Raiders.
On August 16, 2022, Wheatley was waived by the Raiders.

Cleveland Browns
On September 20, 2022, Wheatley signed with the practice squad of the Cleveland Browns. He signed a reserve/future contract on January 9, 2023.

Personal life
Wheatley is the son of Tyrone Wheatley, former Michigan running back and first-round NFL draft pick. Wheatley Sr. is currently the running backs coach of the Denver Broncos.

References

External links
 Stony Brook profile
 Michigan profile

1997 births
Living people
American football offensive linemen
American football tight ends
Michigan Wolverines football players
Stony Brook Seawolves football players
Players of American football from Buffalo, New York
African-American players of American football
21st-century African-American sportspeople
Chicago Bears players
Las Vegas Raiders players
Cleveland Browns players